is a Prefectural Natural Park in Sōma, Fukushima Prefecture, Japan. The park was established in 1951.  is celebrated for its nori and saltwater clams and in 1927 was selected as one of the 100 Famous Views of Japan.

See also
 National Parks of Japan

References

External links
 Map of Matsukawaura Prefectural Natural Park
 Map of the Natural Parks of Fukushima Prefecture (large file)

Parks and gardens in Fukushima Prefecture
Sōma, Fukushima
Protected areas established in 1951
1951 establishments in Japan